The Unnaturals is a gothic horror film directed and written by Antonio Margheriti. It is loosely based on Dino Buzzati's short story "Eppure bussano alla porta" from the collection The Seven Messengers. The film is an Italian and West German co-production between Super International Pictures S.l.P, Edo Cinematografica, and CCC Filmkunst GmbH.

Plot 
On a stormy night, a group of members of London's high society got stuck in the mud. They seek refuge in a remote country house. There they are received by the mysterious Uriat and his taciturn mother. Uriat explains to the guests that his mother has media skills and can communicate with the dead. Some guests are amused and persuaded to take part in a spiritualistic session. But when the old woman begins to tell those present details from the past, the mood quickly changes. It turns out that everyone present has a dark secret with them and the group is entangled in a web of mutual deception, affairs and acts of violence. The hosts are also part of this network, as it finally turns out. You were once charged with a double homicide for which those present are responsible, and seek revenge. None of the guests survived.

Cast 
Joachim Fuchsberger : Ben Taylor
Marianne Koch : Vivian Taylor
Helga Anders : Elizabeth
Claudio Camaso : Alfred
Luciano Pigozzi : Uriat
Dominique Boschero : Margareth

Production
Margheriti stated the shooting title of the film was Trance. The Unnaturals was aimed at a German market and stars Joachim Fuchsberger and Marianne Koch who were very popular actors with German audiences. Margheriti added other Italian actors of his choice including Luciano Pigozzi, a close friend of his.

The film was shot at Tirrenia Studios which was owned by Carlo Ponti. Margheriti used sets left over from several other films ranging from costume dramas to Westerns. For the seance scene in the film, cinematographer Riccardo Pallottini was hung upside down from the ceiling with the camera in his hand and slowly let him descend from the ceiling. He would then bend over backwards to raise the camera to the actors' faces.

Release
The Unnaturals was shown in West Germany on May 30, 1969. It was later released in Italy on September 12, 1969, where it grossed 287 million Italian lire.

Reception
In his book Italian Horror Film Directors, Louis Paul dismissed the film as an " uneven but still interesting tale of revenge".

See also
List of horror films of 1969
List of Italian films of 1969
List of German films of the 1960s

References

Footnotes

Sources

External links

1969 films
1969 horror films
1960s Italian-language films
Films based on works by Dino Buzzati
Films directed by Antonio Margheriti
Films scored by Carlo Savina
Italian horror films
West German films
German horror films
Films shot at Tirrenia Studios
Films based on short fiction
1960s Italian films
1960s German films